Pachychilus anagrammatus was a species of freshwater snail during the Pliocene or Upper Miocene that lived in what is now Texas.

References

External links
  Dall, W. H. (1913). On a brackish water Pliocene fauna of the southern Coastal Plain. Proceedings of The United States National Museum. 46 (2023): 225-237

anagrammatus
Fossil taxa described in 1913
Gastropods described in 1913
Molluscs of the United States
Fossils of the United States
Taxa named by William Healey Dall